Angelo Maurizi (L'Aquila, 19 December 2000) is an Italian rugby union player.
His usual position is as a Flanker and he currently plays for Calvisano in Top12.

He also represented Calvisano in the 2019–20 European Rugby Challenge Cup as Additional Player.

In 2019 and 2020, Maurizi was named in the Italy Under 20 squad.

References 

It's Rugby England Profile
Ultimate Rugby Profile
All Rugby Profile
ESPN Profile

2000 births
Living people
People from L'Aquila
Italian rugby union players
Rugby union flankers
Sportspeople from the Province of L'Aquila